Shakin' Street may refer to:
"Shakin' Street", a song by MC5 from their 1970 album Back in the USA
Shakin' Street, a French rock band founded by Eric Lévi and Fabienne Shine